is a Japanese four-panel manga series written and illustrated by Yū Isihara. Originally published as a web manga on Twitter, it was later picked up for serialization by Kadokawa Corporation, who then began serializing the series on their ComicWalker website in March 2018. The series has been compiled into four tankōbon volumes by Kadokawa Shoten as of October 2022. An original net (ONA) anime adaptation by DLE began releasing on YouTube in August 2022.

Characters

Media

Manga
At Anime Expo 2022, Yen Press announced that they licensed the series for English publication.

Anime
On June 7, 2022, an original net (ONA) anime adaptation was announced. It is animated by DLE and directed by Sorosoro Tanigawa, and began releasing on YouTube on August 2, 2022. Sentai Filmworks has licensed the series.

References

External links
 

2022 anime ONAs
Comics about dogs
Japanese webcomics
Kadokawa Dwango franchises
Kadokawa Shoten manga
Post-apocalyptic anime and manga
Sentai Filmworks
Shōjo manga
Webcomics in print
Yen Press titles
Yonkoma
YouTube original programming